It is known in European history as a rather tumultuous year with the Revolutions of 1830 in France, Belgium, Poland, Switzerland and Italy.

Events

January–March 
 January 11 – LaGrange College (later the University of North Alabama) begins operation, becoming the first publicly chartered college in Alabama.
 January 12–27 – Webster–Hayne debate: Robert Y. Hayne of South Carolina debates the question of states' rights vs. federal authority with Daniel Webster of Massachusetts in the United States Congress.
 February 3 – The London Protocol establishes the full independence and sovereignty of Greece from the Ottoman Empire, as the result of the Greek War of Independence.
 February 5 – A fire destroys the Argyll Rooms in London, where the Philharmonic Society of London presents concerts, but firefighters are able to prevent its further spread by use of their new equipment, steam-powered fire engines.
 March 26 – The Book of Mormon is published in Palmyra, New York.
 March 28 – The Java War ends.

April–June 
 April 6 – Joseph Smith and five others organize the Church of Christ (later renamed the Church of Jesus Christ of Latter Day Saints), the first formally organized church of the Latter Day Saint movement, in northwestern New York.
 May 13 – Ecuador separates from Gran Colombia.
 May 15 – The Royal Swedish Yacht Club (KSSS) is founded.
 May 28 – The United States Congress passes the Indian Removal Act, authorizing the President to negotiate with Native Americans in the United States for their removal from their ancestral homelands. This also has the effect of beginning mass destruction of bison in North America.
 June 12: The Chinese province of Hebei is shaken by a 7.5 earthquake killing more than 7,400 people.
 June 26 – William IV succeeds his brother George IV, as King of the United Kingdom.

July–September 
 July 5 – French invasion of Algiers, leading to creation of French Algeria.
 July 13 – The General Assembly's Institution (later the Scottish Church College), one of the pioneering institutions that ushers in the Bengali Renaissance, is founded by Alexander Duff and Raja Ram Mohan Roy, in Calcutta, India.
 July 17 – Barthélemy Thimonnier is granted a French patent (#7454) for a sewing machine; it chains stitches at 200/minute.
 July 18 – Uruguay adopts its first constitution.
 July 20 – Greece grants citizenship to Romaniote Jews.
 July 26 – The July Revolution in France begins when people in Paris rebel against today's July Ordinances issued at Saint-Cloud by King Charles X of France.
 July 27 – "The Three Glorious Days" of the July Revolution in France begin. The Paris mob clashes with the National Guard: over the period 1,800 rioters and 300 soldiers will die.
 July 29 – "The Three Glorious Days" of the July Revolution in France end with establishment of a provisional government in Paris.
 July 31 – Charles X of France flees to the Château de Rambouillet.
 August 2 – Charles X of France abdicates the throne in favor of his grandson Henri, Count of Chambord, who never takes the throne.
 August 9 – Louis Philippe becomes King of the French.
 August 13 – The Duc de Broglie is appointed Prime Minister of France by Louis Philippe.
 August 25 – The Belgian Revolution begins in Brussels with revolts against King William I of the Netherlands.
 August 31 – Edwin Beard Budding is granted an English patent for the invention of the lawn mower.
 September 15 – Opening of the Liverpool and Manchester Railway in England, the world's first intercity passenger railway operated solely by steam locomotives.
 September 26 – Belgian Revolution: The army of the United Kingdom of the Netherlands fails to retake Brussels, a National Congress is summoned to draw up a Constitution and a Provisional Government of Belgium is established under Charles Latour Rogier.

October–December 
 October 4 – Belgian Revolution: The Provisional Government in Brussels declares the creation of the independent state of Belgium.
 October – The Regeneration in Switzerland begins; more liberal constitutions are adopted in most cantons.
 November 2 – Jacques Laffitte succeeds the Duc de Broglie as Prime Minister of France.
 November 8 – Ferdinand II becomes King of the Two Sicilies.
 November 22
 The Whig Charles Grey, 2nd Earl Grey succeeds Arthur Wellesley, 1st Duke of Wellington, as Prime Minister of the United Kingdom.
 Ustertag in Switzerland: Men of the Canton of Zürich gather to demand a new constitution.
 November 29 – The Polish November Uprising begins in Warsaw against Russian rule.
 December 5 – Hector Berlioz's most famous work, Symphonie fantastique, has its world premiere in Paris.
 December 20 – The independence of Belgium is recognized by the Great Powers.

Date unknown 
 10,000 chests of opium are sold in China.
 Austins of Derry is established in Northern Ireland. Until closure in 2016, it is the world's oldest independent department store.
 The Entuzjastki society is founded in Poland.
 Sogo, a Japanese department store brand founded in Osaka, Japan, as predecessor part of Seven & I Retail Group.

Births

January–June 

 January 7 – Albert Bierstadt, German-American painter (d. 1902)
 January 8 – Hans von Bülow, German conductor, pianist and composer (d. 1894)
 January 21 – Liu Kunyi, Chinese general (d. 1902)
 January 23 – Gaston Alexandre Auguste, Marquis de Galliffet, French general (d. 1909)
 January 31 – James G. Blaine, 28th and 31st United States Secretary of State (d. 1893)
 February 3 – Robert Gascoyne-Cecil, 3rd Marquess of Salisbury, Prime Minister of the United Kingdom (d. 1903)
 February 8 – Abdülaziz, Ottoman Sultan (d. 1876)
 February 16 – Lars Hertervig, Norwegian painter (d. 1902)
 March 15 – Paul Heyse, German writer, Nobel Prize laureate (d. 1914)
 March 26 – Dewitt Clinton Senter, American politician, 18th Governor of Tennessee (d. 1898)
 May 5 – John Batterson Stetson, American hat maker (d. 1906)
 May 9 – Harriet Lane, Acting First Lady of the United States (d. 1903)
 May 10 – François-Marie Raoult, French chemist (d. 1901)
 May 14 – Antonio Annetto Caruana, Maltese archaeologist, author (d. 1905)
 May 29 – Louise Michel, French anarchist  (d. 1905)
 April 9 – Eadweard Muybridge, English photographer, pioneer of photographic studies of motion (d. 1904)
 April 21 – Clémence Royer, French anthropologist (d. 1902)
 June 1 – Martha Hooper Blackler Kalopothakes, American missionary, journalist, translator (d. 1871)
 June 5 – Carmine Crocco, Italian brigand (d. 1905)
 June 22 – Theodor Leschetizky, Polish pianist, professor and composer (d. 1915)

July–December 

 July 8 – Frederick W. Seward, American politician (d. 1915)
 July 10 – Camille Pissarro, French painter (d. 1903)
July 20 – Clements Markham, English explorer (d. 1916)
 July 21 – John H. Lewis, American politician (d. 1929)
 July 22 – William Sooy Smith, American civil engineer and general (d. 1916)
 July 25 – John Jacob Bausch, German-American optician who co-founded Bausch & Lomb (d. 1926)
 August 18 – Emperor Franz Joseph I of Austria (d. 1916)
 August 26 – Daniel Webster Jones, American Latter-day Saint pioneer (d. 1915)
 September 2 – William P. Frye, American politician (d. 1911)
 September 8 – Frédéric Mistral, French writer, Nobel Prize laureate (d. 1914)
 September 12 – William Sprague IV, American politician from Rhode Island (d. 1915)
 September 15 – Porfirio Díaz, 29th President of Mexico (d. 1915)
 September 17 – Maria Theresia Bonzel, German Roman Catholic nun and saint (d. 1905)
 September 20 – Sir Edward Reed, British naval architect, author, politician, and railroad magnate (d. 1906)
 September 22 – Caroline Webster Schermerhorn Astor, prominent American socialite (d. 1908)
 October 10 – Queen Isabella II of Spain (d. 1904)
 November 7 – Emanuele Luigi Galizia, Maltese architect, civil engineer (d. 1907)
 November 8 - Oliver Otis Howard, American Civil War general (d. 1909)
 December 5 – Christina Rossetti, English poet (d. 1894)
 December 10 – Emily Dickinson, American poet (d. 1886)
 December 16 – Kálmán Tisza, 9th Prime Minister of Hungary (d. 1902)
 December 17 – Jules de Goncourt, French writer (d. 1870)
 December 19 – Susan Huntington Gilbert Dickinson, American writer and publisher (d. 1913)
 December 21 – Bartolomé Masó, Cuban patriot (d. 1907)

Date unknown 
 Mary Hunt, American activist (d. 1906)
 Charles D. F. Phillips, British medical doctor (d. 1904)
 Su Sanniang, Chinese rebel (d. 1854)
 Robert Abbott, Australian politician (d. 1901)

Deaths

January–June 

 January 7
 Thomas Lawrence, English painter (b. 1769)
 John Campbell, Australian public servant and politician (b. 1770)
 Carlota Joaquina of Spain, Queen consort of Portugal (b. 1775)
 January 19 – Johann Schweighäuser, German classical scholar (b. 1742)
 January 25 – Benito de Soto, Galician pirate, executed (b. 1805)
 January 26 – Filippo Castagna, Maltese politician (b. 1765)
 February 2 – Manoel da Costa Ataíde, Brazilian painter (b. 1762)
 February 22 – William Badger, master shipbuilder (b. 1752)
 February 23 – Jean-Pierre Norblin de La Gourdaine (Jan Piotr Norblin), French-born Polish painter (b. 1740)
 March 2 – Samuel Thomas von Sömmerring, German physician, anatomist (b. 1755)
 March 7 – Jacques Villeré, first Creole governor of Louisiana (b. 1761)
 March 16 – Sir Robert Farquhar, British merchant, colonial governor and politician (b. 1776)
 March 17 – Laurent de Gouvion Saint-Cyr, French marshal (b. 1764)
 April 14 – Erike Kirstine Kolstad, Norwegian actress (b. 1792)
 June 1 – Swaminarayan (Sahajanand Swami), Indian yogi, central figure in Swaminarayan Hinduism (b. 1781)
 June 4 – Antonio José de Sucre, Venezuelan revolutionary leader, statesman (b. 1795)
 June 26 – King George IV of the United Kingdom (b. 1762)

July–December 

 August 6 – David Walker, African-American abolitionist (b. 1796)
 August 24 – Louis Jean Pierre Vieillot, French ornithologist (b. 1748)
 September 18 – William Hazlitt, English essayist (b. 1778)
 September 23
 Alice Flowerdew, British teacher, poet, and hymnwriter, (b. 1759)
 Elizabeth Monroe, First Lady of the United States (b. 1768)
 October 4 – Ludwig Yorck von Wartenburg, Prussian military leader (b. 1759)
 October 5 – Dinicu Golescu, Romanian writer (b. 1777)
 October 31 – Petar I Petrović-Njegoš, ruler of Montenegro (b. 1747)
 November 8 – Francis I of the Two Sicilies (b. 1777)
 November 18 – Adam Weishaupt, German philosopher (b. 1748)
 November 30 – Pope Pius VIII, Italian pontiff (b. 1761)
 December 6 – Morton Eden, 1st Baron Henley, British diplomat (b. 1752)
 December 8 – Benjamin Constant, Swiss writer (b. 1767)
 December 17 – Simón Bolívar, Venezuelan revolutionary leader, statesman (b. 1783)

Date unknown 
 Temerl Bergson, Polish Jewish businesswoman, philanthropist
 Clelia Durazzo Grimaldi, Italian botanist  (b. 1760)

References